Gelatinase B (92-kDa gelatinase, matrix metalloproteinase 9, type V collagenase, 92-kDa type IV collagenase, macrophage gelatinase, 95 kDa type IV collagenase/gelatinase, collagenase IV, collagenase type IV, gelatinase MMP 9, MMP 9, type IV collagen metalloproteinase) is an enzyme. This enzyme catalyses the following chemical reaction

 Cleavage of gelatin types I and V and collagen types IV and V

This enzyme is similar to gelatinase A, but possesses a further domain. Regarding its structure, Gelatinase B has domains which can bind with gelatin, laminin, and collagens type I and IV- collagenases do not possess these binding domains.

Function 

Due to its role in cleaving collagen in the extracellular matrix, gelatinase B has multiple functional roles in normal physiology.

Neutrophil action 

Gelatinase B, along with elastase, appears to be a regulatory factor in neutrophil migration across the basement membrane. Gelatinase B plays several important functions within neutrophil action, such as degrading extracellular matrix, activation of IL-1β, and cleavage of several chemokines. In a mouse model, Gelatinase B deficiency resulted in resistance to endotoxin shock, suggesting that Gelatinase B is important in sepsis.

Angiogenesis 

Gelatinase B may play an important role in angiogenesis and neovascularization. For example, gelatinase B appears to be involved in the remodeling associated with malignant glioma neovascularization. It is also a key regulator of growth plate formation—both growth plate angiogenesis and the generation of hypertrophic chondrocytes. Knock-out models of Gelatinase B result in delayed apoptosis, vascularization, and ossification of hypertrophic chondrocytes. Lastly, there is significant evidence that Gelatinase B is required for the recruitment of endothelial stem cells, a critical component of angiogenesis

Wound repair 

In in vitro experiments, it has been demonstrated that gelatinase B is greatly upregulated during human respiratory epithelial healing. Using a gelatinase B deficient mouse model, it was seen that gelatinase B coordinated epithelial wound repair and deficient mice were unable to remove the fibrinogen matrix during wound healing. When interacting with TGF-ß1, Gelatinase B also stimulates collagen contraction, aiding in wound closure.

Pathology 

Gelatinase B has been found to be associated with numerous pathological processes, including immunologic and vascular diseases. For example, it has been implicated in the development of aortic aneurysms, and its disruption prevents the development of aortic aneurysms. Elevated gelatinase B levels can also be found in the cases of rheumatoid arthritis and focal brain ischemia.

However, one of its most widely studied associated pathology is the relationship between Gelatinase B and cancer, due to its role in extracellular matrix remodeling and angiogenesis. For example, its increased expression was seen in a metastatic mammary cancer cell line. A.R. Farina and others have argued that Gelatinase B plays a central role in tumor progression, from angiogenesis, to stromal remodeling, and ultimately metastasis. However, because of its physiologic function, it may be difficult to leverage Gelatinase B inhibition into cancer therapy modalities. However, Gelatinase B has been investigated in tumor metastasis diagnosis—complexes of Gelatinase B/Tissue Inhibitors of Metalloproteinases are seen to be increased in gastrointestinal cancer and gynecologic malignancies

See also 
 Gelatinase
 MMP9

References

External links 
 

EC 3.4.24